Livin' tha Life is a 2003 film produced in Compton, CA by Central Avenue Filmworks. The Film was directed by Joe Brown and distributed by Artisan Entertainment.

Synopsis
The basis of the film is a day in the life of two friends, Jamal and Peanut in through their daily routine in Compton. When the two accidentally apprehend a thief found breaking into Jamal's house, the thief then drops dead in front of them. The two place him in the trunk and try and continue on with their day.

Cast
 Shawn Harris - Killer D
 Archie Howard - Big Man
 Hurricane - Barber
 Jarell Jackson - Jamal
 Pepper Jackson - The Kid
 Rodney Perry - Uncle Fred
 Kaluha Richardson - Girlfriend
 Edward D. Smith - Peanut
 Stixx - Burglar
 Zai Wilburn - Lil Mad Dog

Other Info
 The Game used an audio excerpt from this film in his song "The Documentary", featured on The Documentary.
 The film had a US$400 shooting budget.
 This film received negative comparisons to "Friday (1995 film)".
 The clip where the Kid demands a Japanese lady at a liquor store for a refund has since become a viral YouTube video.

References

External links 
 
 The New York Times Movies
 https://movies.yahoo.com/movie/1808466737/info

2003 films
Films set in California
Hood films
Hood comedy films
2000s English-language films
2000s American films